Mitrephora grandiflora is a species of plant in the family Annonaceae. It is native to Karnataka and Kerala in India.

References

grandiflora
Flora of Karnataka
Flora of Kerala
Vulnerable plants
Taxonomy articles created by Polbot